Alumni Soccer Stadium may refer to:

 Alumni Soccer Stadium (Davidson), soccer stadium for Davidson College in Davidson, North Carolina
 Alumni Stadium (Notre Dame), soccer stadium at the University of Notre Dame in Notre Dame, Indiana